Onchidoris muricata is a species of sea slug, a dorid nudibranch, a shell-less marine gastropod mollusc in the family Onchidorididae.

Distribution
This species was described from Norway. It is currently known from the European coasts of the North Atlantic Ocean as far south as the British Isles and the north-west Atlantic as far south as Maine. It is reported from the north-east Pacific Ocean coasts of North America from Friday Harbor, Washington south to Lion Rock, San Luis Obispo County, California.

References

Onchidorididae
Gastropods described in 1776
Taxa named by Otto Friedrich Müller